Wychody  is a village in the administrative district of Gmina Zamośćin Zamość County, Lublin Voivodeship, in eastern Poland, approximately  southwest of Zamość and  southeast of the regional capital of Lublin.

References

Wychody